Andreas Richardos Ndoj (born 2 February 2003) is a professional footballer who plays as a centre-back for Super League club Olympiacos. Born in Greece, he is a youth international for Albania.

Career statistics

Club

Notes

References

2003 births
Living people
Footballers from Athens
Albanian footballers
Albania youth international footballers
Greek footballers
Greece youth international footballers
Greek people of Albanian descent
Association football midfielders
Olympiacos F.C. players
Olympiacos F.C. B players
Super League Greece players
Super League Greece 2 players